"Join Me in Death" is a single by Finnish gothic rock band HIM, taken from their second studio album, Razorblade Romance (2000). It was also released as "Join Me", since they were not allowed to include "Death" in the title for the US version. It was featured in the end credits of the European version of the sci-fi movie The Thirteenth Floor (the US version features the Cardigans' "Erase/Rewind" instead). It is the eighth-best-selling single of all time in Finland.

Overview
HIM performed this song for the first time in Ilosaarirock, Finland, on 11 July 1998, which featured an extra verse not included in the studio versions.

The song has been met with controversy regarding its subject matter. "A couple of people blamed me for a suicide someone committed over here saying that 'Join Me' is an invitation to kill yourself," HIM frontman Ville Valo told the European magazine Metal Hammer in 2003. "What I was trying to do was sort of rip-off 'Don't Fear the Reaper' by Blue Öyster Cult, making a rock track of Romeo And Juliet." Lyrics such as "Would you die tonight for love?" have contributed to the misconception that the song is about suicide, which Valo denies, claiming the lyrics refer to giving things up for the sake of love. "It's not about suicide, that song. It's about giving it all away," Valo told the magazine Modern Fix.

Four versions of the song's video exist: three "lazer versions", two of which include different scenes from the Thirteenth Floor movie, and the fourth being an "ice version", with a vague Romeo and Juliet theme also attributed to the song.

"Join Me In Death" was included in the film The Thirteenth Floor (though not on its soundtrack) and on the Resident Evil: Apocalypse soundtrack in 2004. The band Gregorian covered "Join Me" with Sarah Brightman on their album Masters of Chant: Chapter III and on Brightman's Limited Edition The Harem Tour album. Another Gregorian version exists with vocals performed by Amelia Brightman.

Track listings

Finnish and Australasian CD single
 "Join Me" – 3:39
 "Join Me" (13th Floor mix) – 3:39
 "It's All Tears" (unplugged radio live) – 3:48
 "Rebel Yell" (live version) – 5:12

European CD single
 "Join Me in Death" – 3:39
 "Rebel Yell" (live) – 5:12

German CD single
 "Join Me" – 3:39
 "It's All Tears" – 3:48
 "Rebel Yell" – 5:12
 "Dark Sekret Love" – 5:17
 Some versions of this format omit "Dark Sekret Love"

Charts

Weekly charts

Year-end charts

Certifications and sales

See also
 List of best-selling singles in Finland

References

HIM (Finnish band) songs
1999 singles
1999 songs
Number-one singles in Finland
Number-one singles in Germany
Songs written by Ville Valo